Mónica Pulgar (born 19 May 1971) is a Spanish basketball player. She competed in the women's tournament at the 1992 Summer Olympics.

References

1971 births
Living people
Spanish women's basketball players
Olympic basketball players of Spain
Basketball players at the 1992 Summer Olympics
Sportspeople from León, Spain